On 26 March 2021, a fire broke out in a COVID-19 hospital in Bhandup, Mumbai, India. It killed ten people. Many patients were rescued.

References

2021 disasters in India
2021 fires in Asia
2021 hospital fire
2021 hospital fire
Fires in India
Hospital fires in Asia
March 2021 events in India
Urban fires in Asia